Toxobotys aureans is a moth in the family Crambidae. It was described by Rose and Kirti in 1989. It is found in India (Khasi Hills).

References

Moths described in 1989
Pyraustinae